Ed Harris is a playwright, radio dramatist, comedy writer, librettist, poet and performer based in Brighton, England.

Early life 

Harris grew up in West London and attended Drayton Manor High School and Twyford Church of England High School in Acton. After finishing high school, he worked as a bin man and later a careworker, as well as travelling and working abroad, including waiting tables in Turkey and training huskies in Kiruna, Sweden. He received his first theatrical commission after being ‘discovered’ at a poetry gig he performed at in Brighton in 2002.

Career 

Harris has written extensively for BBC Radio drama and comedy. His first radio play, Porshia, was produced in 2007 and starred Robert Webb

Harris' first play, Never Ever After, was shortlisted for the Meyer-Whitworth Award in 2008.

His first major play, Mongrel Island, was commissioned by Soho Theatre and opened Steve Marmion's first season as artistic director in July 2011. It was later produced in Mexico City in 2014 as Perro Sin Raza, directed by Fernando Rozvar.

Harris' The Cow Play was revived for the Edinburgh Festival Fringe.

His first play for children, What The Thunder Said, won the Writers' Guild Award for Best Children's Play 2017.

Between 2011 and 2015 he won a Sony Gold Radio Academy Award for his series The Resistance Of Mrs Brown, a Writers' Guild Award for Troll and a BBC Audio Drama Award for Billions.

As well as many stand-alone plays, Harris has written numerous series, including an adaption of Franz Kafka's The Castle.

Harris also wrote and starred in the semi-autobiographical play, The Slow Kapow,. He is also the writer of Dot, a sitcom that follows the exploits of some female staff in the Cabinet War Rooms during the Second World War, starring Fenella Woolgar, Kate O'Flynn, Freya Parker, Jane Slavin and David Acton.

Harris is also a published poet.

In 2018, Harris wrote the libretto for a new opera A Shoe Full Of Stars for Opera Schmopera with composer Omar Shahryar.

Works

Awards 
 A Shoe Full Of Stars - YAM Award - RESEO Prize for best Opera.(2018)
 What The Thunder Said - Writers' Guild Award for Best Children's Play (2017)
 Billions - BBC Audio Drama Award (2014) 
 The Resistance Of Mrs Brown - Radio Academy Award (2011)
 Troll - Writers' Guild Award (2011)
 Never Ever After - shortlisted for Meyer-Whitworth Award (2008)

Stage 
 A Shoe Full of Stars (2018) – Opera Schmopera / Gestalt Arts
 Chevalier D'eon (2016) - Menagerie Theatre / Hotbed (2016)
 Chicken Shop (2014) - Islington Community Theatre
 The Cow Play (2014) - Smoke & Oakum / Edinburgh Festival 
 What The Thunder Said (2014) - Theatre Centre / UK tour (revived in 2016)
 Piglet (2012) - Menagerie Theatre / Hotbed Festival
 Mongrel Island (2011) - Soho Theatre / Mexico (2014)
 Total (2008) - Squaremoon / Brighton Festival Fringe
 Never Ever After (2007) - Chalkfoot / UK tour
 Lucy (2006) - National Youth Theatre / Brighton Fringe Festival
 Sugared Grapefruit (2005) - Zygo Arts / Brighton Festival Fringe

Radio 
 Dot (2015–present) - BBC Radio 4 (1x30’ pilot & 3 4x30’ series)
 The Slow Kapow (2017) - BBC Radio 4 Afternoon Drama
 Your Perfect Summer, On Sale Here! (2016) - BBC Radio 4 Afternoon Drama
 The Castle (2015) - BBC Radio 4 Saturday Play (2x60’)
 Pixie Juice (2014) - BBC Radio 4 Afternoon Drama
 The Interplanetary Notes Of Ambassador B (2014) - BBC Radio 4 15-Minute Drama (5x15’)
 Take Me To The North Laine (2013) - BBC Radio 4 Afternoon Drama
 Billions (2013) - BBC Radio 4 Afternoon Drama
 The Resistance Of Mrs Brown (2012) - BBC Radio 4 15-Minute Drama (5x15’)
 The Wall (2011) - BBC Radio 3 The Wire
 Troll (2010) - BBC Radio 4 Afternoon Drama
 The Moment You Feel It (2009) - BBC Radio 4 Afternoon Drama
 Aromatherapy (2009) - BBC Radio 4 Afternoon Drama
 Porshia (2007) - BBC Radio 4 Friday Play
 Bespoken Word (2006) - BBC Radio 4

References 

Year of birth missing (living people)
Living people
English male poets
English radio presenters